Eero Laine (born 17 September 1933) is a Finnish rower. He competed in the men's coxless four event at the 1960 Summer Olympics.

References

1933 births
Living people
Finnish male rowers
Olympic rowers of Finland
Rowers at the 1960 Summer Olympics
Sportspeople from Turku